Bokan may refer to:

Places
Boken, Rawalpindi, a village in Punjab, Pakistan
Bukan, a city in Iran

People
Beau Bokan (born 1981), American musician and singer
Dragoslav Bokan (born 1961), Serbian film director and writer
Neda Bokan (born 1947), Serbian mathematician

See also
Time Bokan, a 1975–1976 Japanese television series
Boka (disambiguation)
Bokane, a village in Croatia
Bokani (disambiguation)